The CN Sportplex is a large recreational facility located in Moncton, New Brunswick, Canada. It consists of ten baseball fields, six soccer fields, and four indoor ice rinks, including the Superior Propane Centre. Also on site is the Dundee Sports Dome, a large air supported structure which offers paintball, golf, soccer and football.

History
After the closure of the shops the lot was a vacant brownfield site until 1997, when its owner, Canada Lands Company, decided it was time to develop the site into something more useful to the community. This was the beginning of a massive cleanup operation to transform the site into an award-winning recreation facility.

Awards
 The International Phoenix Award was given to the CLC for their environmental efforts.
 Canadian Urban Institute Brownie Award for Best Overall Environment Project in Canada was also given to the CLC.
 The City of Moncton received the Scotts Turf Builder Award, presented by the Communities in Bloom Canada competition to the best sports field turf in Canada.

See also
 Moncton Sport Facilities

External links
 Official Website

Sports venues in Moncton